Artur Vieregg was a German figure skater. After his skating career he continued to work also as a figure skating judge. He was lecturer at the “German College for Physical Exercises” (Deutsche Hochschule für Leibesübungen) in Berlin.
He is author of the book “The Skater” (Der Eisläufer).

Results

References
 Book: “Der Eisläufer”, author: Artur Vieregg, year 1932

German male single skaters
Figure skaters from Berlin
Date of birth missing
Place of birth missing